The Battle of Burdwan occurred between the Nawab of Bengal and Maratha empire in 1747. After the dismissal of Mir Jafar by Alivardi Khan, an army was amassed to defend against the invading Maratha forces of Janoji Bhonsle at Orissa. Alivardi Khan managed to heavily repulse and defeat the Marathas in this battle.

References

See also 
 First Battle of Katwa
 Second Battle of Katwa

Burdwan 1747
Burdwan
1747 in India